Endelekhia is a rock band consisting of Dimitris Mitsotakis (lyrics, drums, vocals), Dimitris Leontopoulos (vocals, acoustic guitar), Antonis Dimitriou (electric guitars, vocals), Andreas Vaitoudis (keyboards, samples) and Yorgos Koulouris (bass). The band took shape in 1991 in Athens.

Discography

1994 Endelekhia
 87 ST'
 Tis modas opados
 Dos' mou ena rolo
 Symperasma
 Enantia se kathe logiki
 Alogos - Paralogos
 Diadromes
 Sa dromos viastikos
 Mono gia ligo
 Skliro Kharti
 Aristotelous 130
 Panta th' akougontai oi penies mas

1996 Einai edo... o,ti einai kai pio pera (Εros music)
 Ein' edo
 38.52
 Pos na poume tora alla paramythia
 Akou Vlepe Mila
 Logia kopse
 Υparkhoun lekseis
 To terma t' ouranou
 O Aunan!
 O diarriktis
 To katakathi
 Enoikoi
 O fovos

1997 Voutia apo psila (Fm records)
 O erotas
 Diamantenia provlita
 Mikres khares
 Kante pera
 Pezo (na psakhnoume prosegisi...)
 Daneika
 Voutia apo psila
 Zoes paralliles
 I farsa
 Misi selida enokhes
 ELa
 Pezo (...kato apo tis kornes ton okhimaton)

1999 Khartines saites (Fm records)
 Katadikos
 Eimaste edo
 Na 'rtho ki apopse
 Mas kathreftizei i vrokhi
 Soasmeni gefira
 Den eimai autos pou thes
 Katse sti gonia sou
 Pou na se vro
 Stigmes
 Khartines saites
 Klostes

2000 Kathreftis, multimedia CD single (Fm records)
 Bagasas
 Stin arkhi tou tragoudiou
 Tha s' antanaklo

2001 Sta sinora tis mera, multimedia CD (Fm records)
 Den sas milo ego
 Oi nykhtes
 Na kao
 An nostalgo
 Kapoios me vlepei
 O teleios ponos
 Me tin agapi
 Ola edo gyrnane
 To koritsi
 O ksenos
 Ti tragoudi na sou po
 I fotografi
 Fonissa mana
 Prosmoni

2003 Mia petalouda pou ksefeugei (Fm records)
 An eikhe dyo ilious touti h gi
 I petalouda
 Ma ein' arga
 Krisi panikou
 Ta logia
 Den yparkhei epistrofi
 O drapetis
 Imerologio
 Fthinoporo
 Isoun ekei
 Tou augoustou khalazi
 Pes mou

2005 Mesa mou kryvontai alloi (Fm Records)
 De thelo na thymamai 
 Edo mori, tha legesai Maria 
 Paraskeui
 To astiko
 Panta tha feugo
 O erotas pou zitise polla
 Eimai ena lathos
 Kai epese sti gi
 Ta tragoudia mou einai kleftes
 Mikri istoria
 O vrakhos
 Otan tha 'rthei ksana to kalokeri

External links
 Official site

Greek music
Greek rock music groups
Musical groups from Athens